Gramcko is a surname. Notable people with the surname include:

Adolfo Aristeguieta Gramcko (1929–1998), Venezuelan writer, medical doctor, scout leader, and diplomat
Elsa Gramcko (1925—1994), Venezuelan sculptor and painter
Ida Gramcko (1924–1994), Venezuelan essayist and poet